Llyra is a supervillainess appearing in American comic books published by Marvel Comics.

Publication history

Llyra first appeared in Sub-Mariner #32 (December, 1970) and was created by Roy Thomas and Sal Buscema.

Fictional character biography
Llyra Morris was born in the Milolii Area on the big island of Hawaii.  She is the daughter of Llyron, a member of the water-breathing Homo mermanus who dwell in Lemuria, and Rhonda Morris, a surface woman who inherited her father's oceanarium in Hawaii. Llyron was taken captive by men in the employ of Morris, who were looking for marine specimens to exhibit. Rhonda Morris fell in love with the seaman, and despite the fact that neither could live in the other's environment unaided for very long, they soon were married. Llyron decided not to return to Lemuria and helped his wife find exotic fish for her oceanarium. He perished a few months after they were wed, saving his wife from a shark. Morris bore a daughter she named Llyra. The infant was capable of breathing air as well as water, and would later demonstrate certain other mutant powers, notably the ability to alter the greenish coloration of her skin and hair to resemble her mother's. As Llyra grew into adolescence, she developed multiple identity disorder, and began to believe that when she changed her skin to pink, she was another person, her imaginary twin sister Laurie. Reaching adulthood, Llyra journeyed to her father's land of Lemuria, and through elaborate machinations and the use of her other mutant power to telepathically control marine animals, she usurped the throne from its benevolent ruler, King Karthon, becoming ruler of Lemuria. Several days after her coup, Prince Namor the Sub-Mariner of Atlantis, a friend of Karthon's, voyaged to Lemuria to seek an alliance against the surface people's ocean pollution. Finding Karthon in chains, Namor engaged Llyra in battle. Llyra dispatched some of the most formidable creatures of the deep at Namor, but Namor prevailed. Llyra was then caught in a rockslide caused by a sperm whale under her command and was severely injured, apparently killed. Karthon was freed and regained the throne.

Namor returned Llyra's body to her mother for burial, but Rhonda Morris discovered that her daughter was only in a coma. Using special technology acquired from an undisclosed source, Morris resuscitated Llyra. Llyra journeyed to Lemuria to recruit mercenaries to accompany her to Atlantis where she could wreak vengeance upon Namor. Llyra and her men kidnapped the Lady Dorma, Namor's bride-to-be, and brought her to the oceanarium owned by her mother. Llyra then used her chameleon powers to disguise herself as Dorma. As soon as the wedding ceremony was over, Llyra revealed herself, claiming that she was now Namor's wife, not Dorma. However, according to Atlantean law, even though the real Dorma was not present, it was still Dorma who was now Namor's wife. When she learned her ploy failed, Llyra fled Atlantis. Namor tracked her to her mother's oceanarium. Witnessing his approach, Llyra smashed the water-filled cylinder holding Dorma, and by the time Namor reached her, Dorma had suffocated.

Llyra escaped and became a professional subversive, and soon allied herself with Namor's enemy, Tiger Shark, and his assistant Gerard Lymondo. The three of them awakened the ocean-dwelling creature Krago to vanquish Namor and kidnapped Namor's human father, Leonard McKenzie. In the course of battle with Namor, Tiger Shark split McKenzie's skull with a lead pipe, and he and Llyra fled. Llyra abandoned the Shark to ally herself with Namor's cousin Byrrah. The two of them kidnapped Namor's kinsman Namorita to use as a hostage against Namor. In her scuffle with Namor, Llyra slipped into an oil spring on the ocean bottom and apparently drowned. Llyra was also shown to have fatally poisoned Namora, (though later it was revealed that Namora was still alive). In an as yet unrevealed manner, Llyra had survived the oil spring. After lying low for a time, Llyra freed the surface criminals, the Wizard, Sandman, and the Trapster from prison, to help her carry out her latest plot on Namor's life. Llyra and these criminals formed the new Frightful Four and battled Namor and Spider-Man. Her plot, whereby Namor was supposed to be driven insane by the acquisition of Spider-Man's spider-sense, failed and Namor took Llyra back to Atlantis to stand trial.

Llyra was later broken out of prison by Ghaur, and became the high priestess of Set, playing a role in the events of Atlantis Attacks. She allied with the Deviant Lord Ghaur to bring about the reign of Set. Llyra and Ghaur recruited Krang and Attuma for their scheme. Llyra and Ghaur then reconstructed the Serpent Crown. Their attempted sacrifice of seven superhuman females was thwarted, and Llyra and Ghaur battled Namor, the Fantastic Four, and the Avengers. Llyra was teleported away, and the new Serpent Crown was buried in a sub-sea fissure. She later reappeared, wishing to bear Namor's son as a plot to win the Atlantean throne. Unable to do so, she did the next best thing and slept with Leon McKenzie, the fully human grandson of Namor's father, Leonard McKenzie.  Although neither McKenzie ever set on the throne of Atlantis, due to their bylaws the product of the union, the artificially aged Llyron, nevertheless was a legitimate heir and temporarily took the throne before Namor regained it.

In the events during the Atlantis Rising storyline, Llyra was betrayed by her own son, Llyron, and left dead, chained within the walls of destroyed Atlantis. Prince Namor encountered her there, where she begged her to release him from the shackles. Instead, Prince Namor mercilessly left her to die.

Llyra was seen in the "Marvel Tarot" mini-series, focusing on magic-related characters. Here she had been supplanted by her rival Nagala as high-priestess of Set, as well as transformed into a guardian sea-hag due to her god's displeasure. At the end Nagala likewise falls out of favor as she loses the Serpent Crown to intruding wizard Ian McNee, and the two fight over becoming Set's favored concubine.

Powers and abilities
Llyra is a member of the Lemurian branch of the Homo mermanus race whose shape-changing powers are a mutant ability. Like all Atlanteans and Lemurians, Llyra has a certain degree of superhuman strength and durability, and is able to withstand the ocean pressures. She can breathe underwater and withstand the extreme water pressure and freezing temperatures of the sea. She differs in her ability to alter her skin pigmentation to look like a human, Atlantean, or Lemurian. She also possesses a psionic control over certain orders of marine life, including gigantic sea monsters. As a servant of Set she may also possess certain skills as a mystic.

Llyra temporarily possessed certain hypnotic powers conferred upon her by the Serpent God Set.

Llyra wears a costume of bulletproof fabric. She carries various Atlantean and surface world armaments. She occasionally employs sub-sea crafts, and once used the Wizard's anti-gravity discs for flight.

References

External links
Llyra at the Marvel Universe

Characters created by Roy Thomas
Characters created by Sal Buscema
Comics characters introduced in 1970
Fictional characters from Hawaii
Fictional characters with dissociative identity disorder
Fictional characters with superhuman durability or invulnerability
Fictional murderers
Fictional priests and priestesses
Lemuria (continent) in fiction
Marvel Comics Atlanteans (Homo mermanus)
Marvel Comics characters who are shapeshifters
Marvel Comics characters with superhuman strength
Marvel Comics female supervillains
Marvel Comics mutants
Marvel Comics telepaths